Elections to Barnsley Metropolitan Borough Council were held on 1 May 1975 with one third of the seats up for election. Labour retained control of the council.

Election result

This resulted in the following composition of the council:

Ward results

+/- figures represent changes from the last time these wards were contested.

References

1975 English local elections
1975
1970s in South Yorkshire